Rudolf Marić (13 May 1927, Novi Sad – 26 August 1990, Belgrade) was a Yugoslav chess master and author.

Biography 
Marić was born in Novi Sad in 1921. He was awarded the International Master (IM) title in 1964. In 1956, he represented Yugoslavia at the World Student Team Chess Championship, won the team bronze medal and the individual gold medal for his board. In 1978, he won 3rd Chess Mitropa Cup with the Yugoslav team. He died on 26 August 1990 in Belgrade. FIDE awarded him Honorary Grandmaster (GM) in 1990 shortly after his death. Marić wrote several chess books.

Publications 

 Šahovske minijature, 1973
 Yugoslav Chess Triumphs, 1976

References

External links 

 Rudolf Marić at Chessgames

1927 births
1990 deaths
Chess grandmasters
Yugoslav chess players